Dacalana lucillae is a butterfly of the family Lycaenidae first described by Hisakazu Hayashi, Heinz G. Schroeder and Colin G. Treadaway in 1983. It is found only on Luzon island in the Philippines. The forewing length is 18–19 mm.

References

 , 1983: Neue Arten und Unterarten der Gattungen Dacalana und Pratapa von den Philippinen (Insecta: Lepidoptera: Lycaenidae).: Senckenbergiana Biologica. 63 (1/2): 47–59.
, 1995. Checklist of the butterflies of the Philippine Islands (Lepidoptera: Rhopalocera) Nachrichten des Entomologischen Vereins Apollo Suppl. 14: 7–118.

, 2012. Revised checklist of the butterflies of the Philippine Islands (Lepidoptera: Rhopalocera) Nachrichten des Entomologischen Vereins Apollo Suppl. 20: 1-64.

Butterflies described in 1983
Dacalana